Christopher Douglas Haviland (born 27 February 1952) is an Australian politician. Born in Sydney, he has worked as a public servant with the Commonwealth Department of Health, a teacher, a maths tutor and an umpire for Sydney Grade Cricket. He was district cricketer in Sydney and Perth. He is a leading activist for party democratisation and is an active member of the progressive Left faction. He is the New South Wales State Convenor of grassroots party reform organisation Local Labor.

Local government
In 1987 Haviland was elected to Campbelltown City Council.

In 1991 he was elected to the Executive of the NSW Local Government Association.

Federal politics 
In 1993, Haviland was elected to the Australian House of Representatives as the Labor member for Macarthur, succeeding Stephen Martin, who contested Cunningham instead. In 1996, however, he lost his Labor endorsement and retired from politics.

Haviland is a two-time Labor candidate for the safe Liberal seat of Bradfield. In 2013 Haviland achieved 29.2 percent of the two-party vote. and he was the candidate for the 2019 Australian federal election.

References

Australian Labor Party members of the Parliament of Australia
Members of the Australian House of Representatives for Macarthur
Members of the Australian House of Representatives
1952 births
Living people
Australian cricket umpires
Australian public servants
Australian schoolteachers
Mathematics educators
20th-century Australian politicians
Labor Left politicians